Carlton South was an electoral district of the Legislative Assembly in the Australian state of Victoria situated in the inner-Melbourne suburb of Carlton from 1889 to 1904.

Members for Carlton South

      # =by-election

References

Former electoral districts of Victoria (Australia)
1889 establishments in Australia
1904 disestablishments in Australia